The kodkod (Leopardus guigna), also called guiña, is the smallest felid species native to the Americas. It lives primarily in central and southern Chile, as well as marginally in adjoining areas of Argentina. Since 2002, it has been listed as Vulnerable on the IUCN Red List as the total population may be less than 10,000 mature individuals; it is threatened by persecution, and loss of habitat and prey base.

Characteristics
The kodkod's fur color ranges from brownish-yellow to grey-brown. It has dark spots, a pale underside and a ringed tail. The ears are black with a white spot, while the dark spots on the shoulders and neck almost merge to form a series of dotted streaks. Melanistic kodkods with spotted black coats are quite common. It has a small head, large feet, and a thick tail.

Melanistic phenotype
The melanistic phenotype is caused by the deletion of a single cysteine residue at position 126 of Agouti-signaling protein. This disrupts one of the four disulphide bonds in the normal protein, altering its tertiary structure and reducing its ability to bind to the melanocortin 1 receptor. Normally this interaction upregulates the production of orange pheomelanin and downregulates the production of black eumelanin, however, in the mutated form, this interaction is prevented, resulting in darker coat color than normal.

Taxonomy
Felis guigna was the scientific name used in 1782 by Juan Ignacio Molina who first described a kodkod from Chile.
Felis tigrillo was the name used in 1844 by Heinrich Rudolf Schinz.

The genus Leopardus was proposed in 1842 by John Edward Gray, when he described two spotted cat skins from Central America and two from India in the collection of the Natural History Museum, London.
The subgenus Oncifelis was proposed in 1851 by Nikolai Severtzov with the Geoffroy's cat as type species.
The kodkod was subordinated to Leopardus in 1958, and to  Oncifelis in 1978.

Today, the genus Leopardus is widely recognized as valid, with two kodkod subspecies:
 L. g. guigna (Molina, 1782) occurs in southern Chile and Argentina
 L. g. tigrillo (Schinz, 1844) occurs in central and northern Chile

Distribution and habitat 
The kodkod is strongly associated with mixed temperate rainforests of the southern Andean and coastal ranges, particularly the Valdivian and Araucaria forests of Chile, which is characterized by the presence of bamboo in the understory. It prefers evergreen temperate rainforest habitats to deciduous temperate moist forests, sclerophyllous scrub and coniferous forests. It is tolerant of altered habitats, being found in secondary forest and shrub as well as primary forest, and on the fringes of settled and cultivated areas.
In Argentina, it has been recorded from moist montane forest, which has Valdivian temperate rain forest characteristics, including a multi-layered structure with bamboo, and numerous lianas and epiphytes.

Ecology and behavior
Kodkods are equally active during the day and during the night, although they only venture into open terrain under the cover of darkness. During the day, they rest in dense vegetation in ravines, along streams with heavy cover, and in piles of dead gorse. They are excellent climbers, and easily able to climb trees more than a meter in diameter. They are terrestrial predators of birds, lizards and rodents in the ravines and forested areas, feeding on southern lapwing, austral thrush, chucao tapaculo, huet-huet, domestic geese and chicken.

Male kodkods maintain exclusive territories  in size, while females occupy smaller ranges of just .

Reproduction 
The gestation period lasts about 72–78 days. The average litter size is one to three kittens. This species may live to be about 11 years old.

Threats 
The major threat to the kodkod is logging of its temperate moist forest habitat, and the spread of pine forest plantations and agriculture, particularly in central Chile. In 1997 to 1998, two out of five radio-collared kodkods were killed on Chiloé Island while raiding chicken coops.

The Photo Ark
 On May 15, 2020, National Geographic announced that the kodkod was the milestone 10,000th animal photographed for The Photo Ark, bringing the project about two-thirds of the way toward completion.

References

External links

  

guigna
Felids of South America
Mammals of Patagonia
Mammals of the Andes
Mammals of Chile
Mammals of Argentina
Mammals described in 1782
Fauna of the Valdivian temperate rainforest